Events in the year 1751 in India.

Events
National income - ₹8,837 million
Robert Clive defends Arcot.

References

 
India
Years of the 18th century in India